850 Squadron was a short-lived Royal Australian Navy Fleet Air Arm fighter squadron. 
Previously 850 Naval Air Squadron (850 NAS) had been a Naval Air Squadron of the Royal Navy's Fleet Air Arm. The squadron had been active in 1943 and 1943-1944.

850 Squadron was (re)formed by Australia at HMAS Albatross on 12 January 1953. Equipped with Hawker Sea Fury aircraft, the Squadron was embarked on HMAS Sydney during her post- Korean War patrol of Korean waters in 1953. It operated briefly out of Hong Kong before returning to Australia in early 1954 where it embarked aboard HMAS Vengeance for a short period. It was then was disbanded on 3 August 1954.

Notes

References

External links
 RAN history of 850 Squadron

Flying squadrons of the Royal Australian Navy
Military units and formations established in 1953
Military units and formations disestablished in 1954